Star Radio Malawi is a private FM radio station in Malawi. Based in Blantyre, the station broadcasts across the country. It broadcasts on 88.7, 87.9, 94.4, 98.5 and 96.5 MHz

References 
 http://www.bestofmalawi.com/news/160/.../1812/2009-04-07.html

External links 
 http://www.starradiomw.com

Radio stations in Malawi
Radio stations established in 2006
Mass media in Blantyre